The Turkish Amateur Football Championship or Turkish Amateur Teams Championship was a former amateur football championship in Turkey. It was organised by the Turkish Football Federation. The championship format was based on a knockout competition. It was held from 1952 to 1996. After 1951, when the former top-level Turkish Football Championship was folded, this competition succeeded it, being no longer the first tier championship in Turkey with only amateur teams as participants.

İzmir Denizgücü is the most successful club with four titles.

Champions

Performance by club

See also
Turkish Amateur Football Leagues

References
Citations

Publications
 Somalı, Vâlâ. Teknik, Taktik Yönleriyle Futbol ve Tarihi. İnkılâp Kitabevi
 San, Haluk; Dağlaroğlu, Rüştü. Türk Futbol Tarihi – TFF Yayınları

External links
 Turkish Football Federation

Defunct football leagues in Turkey
1952 establishments in Turkey
1996 disestablishments in Turkey
Recurring sporting events established in 1952
Recurring events disestablished in 1996
Football